Durham County Council is a local unitary authority governing local government functions for the County Durham district of North East England. The council area covers part of wider ceremonial County Durham. County Hall in Durham is the council's headquarters.

Between its establishment in 1889 and major local government reforms in England in 1974, the council administered the historic county of Durham. From 1974 until 2009 the district area was governed as a non-metropolitan county.

Following the 2021 Durham County Council election the council is under no overall control. A Conservative/Liberal Democrat/Independents coalition was formed at the 2021 Annual General Meeting. From 1919 to 2021 the council was under the control of the Labour Party, who held a majority except from 1922 to 1925.

History

The Local Government Act 1888 created Durham County Council with effect from April 1889 as the upper-tier local authority for the administrative county of Durham. At the same time, Gateshead, South Shields, and Sunderland were made county boroughs, exempting them from county council control. The first elections took place in January 1889. Darlington became a separate county borough in 1915, Hartlepool in 1967, and Teesside in 1969. Durham was the first county council to be controlled by the Labour Party, which won the most seats in 1919.

In 1974, the boundaries of the council area changed significantly as the new counties of Tyne and Wear and Cleveland were created, taking in areas in the northeast and southeast of County Durham. At the same time, the county council area gained the part of Teesdale south of the River Tees from the North Riding of Yorkshire.

In 1997 Darlington became a unitary authority, removing it from county council control.

Durham County Council itself became a unitary authority on 1 April 2009, when the seven remaining non-metropolitan districts of the county (Durham (City), Easington, Sedgefield (Borough), Teesdale, Wear Valley, Derwentside, and Chester-le-Street) were abolished and the county council absorbed their functions.

The legislation which created the unitary authority allowed the council to name itself 'Durham Council', but in the event the name 'Durham County Council' was kept.

Geography
The unitary district is situated around the non-metropolitan areas of County Durham, covering the towns of Consett, Barnard Castle, Peterlee, Seaham, Bishop Auckland, Newton Aycliffe, Middleton-in-Teesdale, Shildon, Chester-le-Street, Crook, Stanhope, Spennymoor, Ferryhill, Sedgefield and the cathedral city of Durham. As well as all surrounding hamlets, villages and suburbs of the unitary authority.

Darlington, Hartlepool and the parts of Stockton-on-Tees North of the River Tees are still part of the ceremonial county of County Durham but separate from the new unitary authority.

References

External links
 

Billing authorities in England
Durham, England
English unitary authorities created in 2009
Former county councils of England
Leader and cabinet executives
Local authorities in County Durham
Local education authorities in England
Local government in County Durham
Unitary authority councils of England